The Italian GT Championship (Campionato Italiano Gran Turismo) is an Italian sports car series founded in 2003 and organized by the Automobile Club d'Italia (ACI) and the Commissione Sportiva Automobilistica Italiana (CSAI). It replaced a previous supercar-based championship which ran from 1992 until 2002 when it was folded due to a lack of entrants. The series borrowed heavily from the international FIA GT Championship in its first few seasons, although additional entries from Ferrari Challenge, Porsche Supercup, and Maserati Trofeo competitors were allowed.

Following the 2006 season, the top GT1 class was dropped from the championship, leaving competitors in the GT2, GT3, and GT Cup classes. GT2 competition is dominated by the Ferrari F430, with several Porsche 911 GT3s as well. The GT3 class features a variety of machines from the FIA GT3 European Championship, from Aston Martin, Chrysler and Lamborghini, while the GT Cup class is once again made up of Ferrari Challenge and Porsche Supercup cars.

Champions

References

External links
 
 Italian GT results (1992–2005)
 Italian GT Championship results and photo galleries

Sports car racing series
Gt Championship
Recurring sporting events established in 1992
GT
Group GT3

GT4 (sports car class)